Andrew Welch may refer to:

 Andrew Welch (theatre producer) (born 1949), British theatre producer
 Andrew Welch (politician) (born 1972), American politician in the Georgia House of Representatives

See also 
 Andrew Welsh (disambiguation)